Prättigau/Davos District is a former administrative district in the canton of Graubünden, Switzerland. It was replaced with the Prättigau/Davos Region on 1 January 2017 as part of a reorganization of the Canton.

It consists of seven Kreise (sub-districts) and fifteen municipalities:

The sub-districts Davos, Jenaz, Klosters, Küblis and Luzein belonged until 1986 to the defunct  district Oberlandquart; the sub-districts Schiers and Seewis to the defunct district Unterlandquart.

Mergers
On 1 January 2016 the former municipality of Saas im Prättigau merged into Klosters-Serneus.

Languages

References

Districts of Graubünden